Kiki Bertens was the defending champion, but lost in the second round to Venus Williams.

Madison Keys won the title, defeating Svetlana Kuznetsova in the final, 7–5, 7–6(7–5).

Naomi Osaka retained the WTA no. 1 singles ranking after the tournament. Ashleigh Barty and Karolína Plíšková were also in contention for the top ranking at the start of the tournament.

This tournament marked Maria Sharapova's final WTA tour victory before her retirement; she defeated Alison Riske in the first round before losing to Barty in the second round.

Seeds
The top eight seeds received a bye into the second round.

Draw

Finals

Top half

Section 1

Section 2

Bottom half

Section 3

Section 4

Qualifying

Seeds

Qualifiers

Lucky losers

Qualifying draw

First qualifier

Second qualifier

Third qualifier

Fourth qualifier

Fifth qualifier

Sixth qualifier

Seventh qualifier

Eighth qualifier

References

Sources
Main Draw
Qualifying Draw

Women's Singles